The Sleepover Club is a series of children's books by authors Rose Impey, Narinder Dhami, Lorna Read , Fiona Cummings, Louis Catt, Sue Mongredien (aka Lucy Diamond), Angie Bates, Ginny Deals, Harriet Castor and Jana Novotny Hunter. It has also been adapted into a children's television programme. While the books were set in Cuddington, Leicester, England, the television show was set in the fictional Australian beachside suburb of Crescent Bay. The books revolve around five young girls who are part of a club in which they sleepover at each other's houses at least once a week. The television series do not portray the same stories as the books with the possible exception of the first episode which loosely resembled the story where the girls try and set up their 'Brown Owl' with their school care-taker.

The girls' names are Francesca "Frankie" Thomas, Rosie Cartwright, Felicity "Fliss" Sidebotham (Later "Proudlove"),  Lyndsey "Lyndz" Collins and Laura "Kenny" McKenzie. Their rivals are two, snobbish girls in their class named Emma Hughes (nicknamed "The Queen") and Emily Berryman (nicknamed "The Goblin"). This pair are also referred to as the Gruesome Twosome or "The M&Ms."  There are 54 books: 
 The Sleepover Club at Frankie’s
 The Sleepover Club at Lyndsey’s
 The Sleepover Club at Felicity’s
 The Sleepover Club at Rosie’s
 The Sleepover Club at Kenny’s
 Starring the sleepover club
 The Sleepover Girls Go Pop (A.K.A Sleepover Girls Go Spice)
 The 24-Hour Sleepover Club
 The Sleepover Club Sleeps Out
 Happy Birthday Sleepover Club
 Sleepover Girls on Horseback
 Sleepover in Spain
 Sleepover on Friday 13th
 The Sleepover Girls Go Camping
 Sleepover Girls Go Detective
 Sleepover Girls Go Designer
 The Sleepover Girls Surf the Net
 Sleepover Girls on Screen
 Sleepover Girls and Friends
 Sleepover Girls on the Catwalk
 Sleepover Girls go for Goal
 Sleepover Girls Go Babysitting
 Sleepover Girls Go Snowboarding
 Happy New Year, Sleepover Club
 Sleepover Girls Go Green (A.K.A Sleepover Club 2000)
 We Love You Sleepover Club
 Vive le Sleepover Club
 Sleepover Club Eggstavaganza
 Emergency Sleepover
 Sleepover Girls on the Range
 The Sleepover Club Bridesmaids
 Sleepover Club See Stars
 Sleepover Club Blitz
 Sleepover Girls in the Ring
 Sari Sleepover
 Merry Christmas Sleepover Club
 The Sleepover Club Down Under
 Sleepover Girls Go Splash
 Sleepover Girls Go Karting
 Sleepover Girls Go Wild!
 The Sleepover Club at the Carnival
 The Sleepover Club at the Beach
 Sleepover Club Vampires
 sleepoverclub.com
 Sleepover Girls Go Dancing
 The Sleepover Club on the Farm
 Sleepover Girls Go Gymnastic
 Sleepover Girls on the Ball
 Sleepover Club Witches
 Sleepover Club Ponies
 Sleepover Girls on Safari
 Sleepover Club Makeover
 Sleepover Girls Go Surfing
 Sleepover Girls go Treasure Hunting

Series of children's books
British children's novels
Novels set in Leicestershire